Mostar is a monthly magazine of culture and current affairs. It began publishing in March 2005. Its name originates from the Stari Most in Bosnia-Herzegovina.

Content of Magazine

File subjects

Awards 
 On January 1, 2010, Mostar has been awarded as "Magazine of the Year" by Writers Union of Turkey.
 On April 12, 2012, Mostar has won the reward of "Magazine of the Year" from International Association of Islamic World Journalist and Authors (ULGAYAD)

Notes

External links 
 Official Site

Cultural magazines published in Turkey
Turkish-language magazines
Monthly magazines published in Turkey
Magazines established in 2005
2005 establishments in Turkey
Magazines published in Istanbul